Events from the year 1716 in Denmark.

Incumbents
 Monarch – Frederick IV
 Grand Chancellor – Christian Christophersen Sehested

Events
 8 March  The Battle of Høland.

 8 July – Battle of Dynekilen, battle of the Great Northern War.
 3 August – Martin Düssel and Christoffer Düssel are ennobled with letters patent under the name “von Falkenskiold”, founding the noble House of Falkenskiold.

Undatd
  Peter the Great visits Copenhagen. He ascendsthe Round Tower on horseback  while visiting Copenhagen. His wife, Catherine I, reportedly ascended behind him in a carriage.
 Johan Ludvig Holstein settles as a coirtuer and government official in Denmark.

Births
 24 July  Bolle Willum Luxdorph, government official and landowner (died 1788)

Full date missing
 Peder Olsen Walløe, arctic explorer (doed 1683)
 Johann Georg Ziesenis, painter (died 1887)

Deaths

References

 
1710s in Denmark
Denmark
Years of the 18th century in Denmark